Pale corydalis is a common name used to refer to:
 Corydalis flavula, an annual plant native to the eastern United States, also known as yellow fumewort
 Capnoides sempervirens, an annual or biennial plant native to northern North America
 Pseudofumaria alba, also known as white corydalis